Tülomsaş Museum is a transport technology museum in Eskişehir, Turkey.

It was opened to visits on 3 March 2018.
Some of the displayed items are the following:
Devrim: The first ever Turkish manufactured automobile in 1961. It was never put into mass production.  There are only two prototype cars, of which the other one is on display in Ankara.
K2200: Narrow-gauge railway locomotive manufactured by the company.
Karakurt: The first ever Turkish locomotive manufactured in Turkey in 1961. It was used for 15 years by Turkish State Railways.

Gallery

References

Technology museums in Turkey
Transport museums in Turkey
Museums in Eskişehir
Museums established in 2018
2018 establishments in Turkey